The Grubb–Sigmon–Weisiger House, also known as the Grubb–Grimes–Sigmon House, is a historic home located at Salisbury, Rowan County, North Carolina.  It was built in 1911, and is a large two-story, Queen Anne style frame dwelling. It is sheathed in weatherboard and has a wraparound porch.  It was rotated 90 degrees to its present orientation in 1927, and the interiors redesigned in the Colonial Revival style in 1939.  Other contributing resources are the guest house (c. 1941), playhouse (c. 1928–1930), a garage / stable (c. 1927), truck-garage / workshop (c. 1942), smokehouse (c. 1942), and greenhouse (c. 1933).

It was listed on the National Register of Historic Places in 1999.

References

Houses on the National Register of Historic Places in North Carolina
Queen Anne architecture in North Carolina
Colonial Revival architecture in North Carolina
Houses completed in 1911
Houses in Salisbury, North Carolina
National Register of Historic Places in Rowan County, North Carolina